Clifford Bluemel (9 November 1885 – 27 June 1973) was an American brigadier general. He commanded the 31st Division during the Battle of Bataan before being captured by Japanese forces and held as a prisoner of war.

Biography
Bluemel was born and raised in New Jersey. He graduated from the United States Military Academy on June 11, 1909. After World War I, Bluemel graduated from the advanced course at the Infantry School in 1926 and then from the Command and General Staff School in 1927. He was promoted to colonel effective September 1, 1938 and then temporarily advanced to brigadier general on December 24, 1941. His final assignment was as commanding general of Fort Benjamin Harrison from 1946 to 1947.

After his death, Bluemel was buried at the West Point Cemetery on June 29, 1973.

See also
Philippine Division
Douglas MacArthur
United States Army Forces in the Far East

References

Bibliography

External links

Military Times Hall of Valor
Generals of World War II

1885 births
1973 deaths
People from Trenton, New Jersey
United States Military Academy alumni
Military personnel from New Jersey
United States Army personnel of World War I
United States Army Command and General Staff College alumni
United States Army generals of World War II
American prisoners of war in World War II
World War II prisoners of war held by Japan
Bataan Death March prisoners
Recipients of the Silver Star
Recipients of the Distinguished Service Cross (United States)
Recipients of the Distinguished Service Medal (US Army)
United States Army generals
Burials at West Point Cemetery